Clube Ferroviário de Nampula is a Mozambican football club based in Nampula. They play in the top division in Mozambican football, Moçambola. Their home stadium is Estádio do Nampula. From 1993 to 2002, Filipe Nhussi, the current President of Mozambique, served as president of the club.

Achievements
Moçambola
 Winners (1): 2004

Taça de Moçambique: 1
 Winners (1): 2003
 Runners-up (1): 2007

Supertaça de Moçambique
 Runners-up (3): 2004, 2005, 2008

Performance in CAF competitions
CAF Champions League: 1 appearance
2005 – Preliminary Round

CAF Confederation Cup: 2 appearances
2004 – Preliminary Round
2008 – Preliminary Round

Current squad

References

External links
 Ferroviário de Nampula
 Club profile at GlobalSportsArchive
 Club profile at NationalFootballTeams
 Club profile at Soccerway

Ferroviario de Nampula
Nampula
Association football clubs established in 1924
1924 establishments in Mozambique